Songs by Burke and Van Heusen is a 1959 studio album by Lena Horne, of songs written by Johnny Burke and Jimmy Van Heusen. This album was released in some countries with the alternative title A Friend Of Yours. Recorded with Lennie Hayton and His Orchestra at the RCA Victor studio, New York on December 1 and 9, 1958, completed on January 5, 1959. The complete album has been re-issued on CD in Stereo, firstly in 2001 by BMG, Japan and by Avid Easy Records in 2010.

Track listing
 "You Don't Have to Know the Language" – 2:56
 "Like Someone in Love" – 2:59
 "It's Anybody's Spring" – 2:21
 "But Beautiful" – 4:03
 "Just My Luck" – 2:35
 "Get Rid of Monday" – 2:53
 "A Friend of Yours" – 3:11
 "It Could Happen to You" – 2:56
 "Sleigh Ride in July" – 3:24
 "My Heart Is a Hobo" – 1:56
 "Polka Dots and Moonbeams" – 3:09
 "Ring the Bell" – 3:11

All music composed by Jimmy Van Heusen, and all lyrics written by  Johnny Burke.

Personnel

Performance
Lena Horne - vocals
Lennie Hayton – arranger
Ralph Burns - arranger

References

1959 albums
Lena Horne albums
Albums arranged by Lennie Hayton
Albums arranged by Ralph Burns
RCA Records albums